This is a list of electoral results for the Electoral district of North-East Fremantle in Western Australian state elections.

Members for North-East Fremantle

Election results

Elections in the 1940s

Elections in the 1930s

Elections in the 1920s

Elections in the 1910s

 Preferences were not distributed.

References

Western Australian state electoral results by district